Archduchess Margarethe Klementine Maria of Austria (in German: Margarethe Klementine Maria, Erzherzogin von Österreich; in Hungarian: Habsburg–Toscanai Margit Klementina Mária főhercegnő; 6 July 1870, Alcsút, Austria-Hungary– 2 May 1955, Regensburg) was a member of the Hungarian line of the House of Habsburg and an Archduchess of Austria by birth. Through her marriage to Albert, 8th Prince of Thurn and Taxis, Margarethe Klementine  was also a member of the House of Thurn and Taxis.

Family
Margarethe Klementine was the third-eldest daughter and child of Archduke Joseph Karl of Austria and his wife Princess Clotilde of Saxe-Coburg and Gotha. Through her father Joseph Karl, Margarethe Klementine was a great-granddaughter of Leopold II, Holy Roman Emperor. Through her mother, she was a great-granddaughter of Louis-Philippe d'Orléans, King of the French.

Margarethe Klementine married Albert, 8th Prince of Thurn and Taxis, younger son of Maximilian Anton Lamoral, Hereditary Prince of Thurn and Taxis and his wife Duchess Helene in Bavaria, on 15 July 1890 in Budapest, Austria-Hungary. Margarethe Klementine and Albert had eight children:

Franz Joseph, 9th Prince of Thurn and Taxis (21 December 1893 – 13 July 1971), married Princess Isabel Maria of Braganza, daughter of Miguel, Duke of Braganza
Prince Joseph Albert of Thurn and Taxis (4 November 1895 – 7 December 1895)
Karl August, 10th Prince of Thurn and Taxis (23 July 1898 – 26 April 1982), married Princess Maria Anna of Braganza, daughter of Miguel, Duke of Braganza
Prince Ludwig Philipp of Thurn and Taxis (2 February 1901 – 22 April 1933), married Princess Elisabeth of Luxembourg, daughter of Grand Duke William IV of Luxembourg
Prince Max Emanuel of Thurn and Taxis  (1 March 1902 – 3 October 1994)
Princess Elisabeth Helene of Thurn and Taxis (15 December 1903 – 22 October 1976), married Friedrich Christian, Margrave of Meissen
Prince Raphael Rainer of Thurn and Taxis (30 May 1906 – 8 June 1993), married Princess Margarete of Thurn and Taxis
Prince Philipp Ernst of Thurn and Taxis (7 May 1908 – 23 July 1964), married Princess Eulalia of Thurn and Taxis

Ancestry

References

1870 births
1952 deaths
People from Fejér County
House of Habsburg-Lorraine
Austrian princesses
Princesses of Thurn und Taxis
Dames of Malta
Burials at the Gruftkapelle, St. Emmeram's Abbey